Fort Anderson or Camp Anderson, was a military post first established in May 1862 by California Volunteers during the Bald Hills War.  It was located on Redwood Creek, below its confluence with Minor Creek, between Fort Humboldt and Fort Gaston.  It was abandoned in the winter of 1862, but reestablished in 1864 and finally closed in 1866.

References

Fort Anderson
United States Army posts
Military installations in California
History of Humboldt County, California
American Civil War army posts
1862 establishments in California
Military installations closed in 1866
1866 disestablishments in California
Formerly Used Defense Sites in California